Diane Reis Macedo (born February 28, 1982) is an American news personality. She is currently employed by ABC News where she serves as one of the anchors of ABC News Live. She also frequently fills-in as the pop news anchor on the weekend version of Good Morning America. Before coming to ABC News, She was a weekend morning anchor for WCBS-TV in New York City. Macedo announced her departure from WCBS on March 6, 2016.

She used to be an editor for FoxNews.com and an on-air reporter for the Fox Business. She is also the lead female singer for a musical ensemble called Tribeca Rhythm.

Career
Born and raised in Mineola, New York, Macedo is the daughter of immigrant parents from the Minho region of Portugal. She attended Boston College. There, she was a political science and communications double major and a member of the co-ed a cappella singing group, the Bostonians of Boston College. Macedo began her career in journalism as a guest booker for Fox News Radio. She was promoted to a news editor and reporter for FoxNews.com, and to on-air broadcaster. From 2011 to 2013 Macedo was seen on the Fox Business reading business news during Imus in the Morning. She was also a regular panelist on the Fox News program Red Eye w/ Greg Gutfeld.

In addition to her past work as a mezzo-soprano with Paradise Alley, Macedo has performed with the New Jersey-based cover band TheGoodLife. She is fluent in Portuguese and Spanish.  She is married to Thomas Morgan as of 2013. On June 28, 2018, she announced she was expecting her first child.

References

External links
 CBS New York page

1982 births
American people of Portuguese descent
Morrissey College of Arts & Sciences alumni
Living people
American mezzo-sopranos
People from Mineola, New York
American television news anchors
ABC News personalities
21st-century American singers
21st-century American women singers
American women television journalists